Was He a Coward? is a 1911 American short silent Western film directed by D. W. Griffith and starring Blanche Sweet. A print of the film survives in the film archive of the Museum of Modern Art.

Cast
 Wilfred Lucas as Norris Hilton
 Joseph Graybill as Hilton's Friend
 W. Chrystie Miller as The Rancher
 Blanche Sweet as Kate, the Rancher's Daughter
 Dell Henderson as The Foreman
 Kate Toncray as The Maid
 Francis J. Grandon as The Doctor
 Guy Hedlund as An Indian

See also
 D. W. Griffith filmography
 Blanche Sweet filmography

References

External links
 
 allrovi listing

1911 films
1911 Western (genre) films
1911 short films
American black-and-white films
American silent short films
Biograph Company films
Films directed by D. W. Griffith
Silent American Western (genre) films
1910s American films
1910s English-language films